Momoko Kobori and Hiroko Kuwata were the defending champions but Kobori chose not to participate. Kuwata partnered alongside Kateryna Volodko, but lost in the semifinals to Adriana Reami and Anna Rogers.

Reami and Rogers went on to win the title, defeating Elysia Bolton and Jamie Loeb in the final, 6–4, 7–5.

Seeds

Draw

Draw

References

External Links
Main Draw

Caldas da Rainha Ladies Open - Doubles